Sir George Houston Reid,  (25 February 1845 – 12 September 1918) was an Australian politician who led the Reid Government as the fourth Prime Minister of Australia, from 1904 to 1905, having previously been Premier of New South Wales from 1894 to 1899. He led the Free Trade Party from 1891 to 1908.

Reid was born in Johnstone, Renfrewshire, Scotland. He and his family immigrated to Australia when he was young. They initially settled in Melbourne, but moved to Sydney when Reid was 13, at which point he left school and began working as a clerk. He later joined the New South Wales civil service, and rose through the ranks to become secretary of the Attorney-General's Department. Reid was also something of a public intellectual, publishing several works in defence of liberalism and free trade. He began studying law in 1876 and was admitted to the bar in 1879. In 1880, he resigned from the civil service to run for parliament, winning election to the New South Wales Legislative Assembly.

From 1883 to 1884, Reid was Minister of Public Instruction in the government of Alexander Stuart. He joined the Free Trade Party of Henry Parkes in 1887, but refused to serve in Parkes' governments due to personal enmity. When Parkes resigned as party leader in 1891, Reid was elected in his place. He became premier after the 1894 election and remained in office for just over five years. Despite never winning majority government, Reid was able to pass a number of domestic reforms concerning the civil service and public finances. He was an advocate of federation and played a part in drafting the Constitution of Australia, where he became known as a strong defender of his colony's interests. In 1901, he was elected to the new Federal Parliament representing the Division of East Sydney.

Reid retained the leadership of the Free Trade and Liberal Association after federation, and consequently became Australia's first Leader of the Opposition. For the first few years, the Protectionist Party governed with the support of the Australian Labor Party. Alfred Deakin's Protectionist minority government collapsed in April 1904, and he was briefly succeeded by Labor's Chris Watson, who proved unable to govern and resigned after four months. As a result, Reid became prime minister in August 1904, heading yet another minority government. He included four Protectionists in his cabinet, but was unable to achieve much before his government was brought down in July 1905. One notable exception was the passage of the landmark Commonwealth Conciliation and Arbitration Act 1904, which dealt with industrial relations.

At the 1906 election, Reid secured the most votes in the Australian House of Representatives and the equal-most seats, but was well short of a majority and could not form government. He resigned as party leader in 1908, after opposing the formation of the Commonwealth Liberal Party (a merger with the Protectionists). Reid accepted an appointment as Australia's first High Commissioner to the United Kingdom in 1910, and remained in the position until 1916. He subsequently won election to the House of Commons of the United Kingdom, serving until his sudden death two years later.

Early life
Reid was born on 25 February 1845 in Johnstone, Renfrewshire, Scotland. He was the fifth of seven children born to Marion (née Crybbace) and John Reid; he had four older brothers and two younger sisters. He was named after George Houstoun, a former Conservative MP for the Renfrewshire constituency who had died a few years earlier. Reid's father, the son of a farmer, was born in Tarbolton, Ayrshire. At the time of George's birth he was a minister in the Church of Scotland, which he had joined in 1839 after previously ministering in various secessionist Presbyterian churches; he remained loyal to the established church in the Disruption of 1843. In 1834, he had married the daughter of another minister, Edward Crybbace; she was about nine years his junior.

In April 1845, Reid and his family moved to Liverpool, England, where his father had been appointed minister of an expatriate Presbyterian congregation. His two younger sisters were born there. The family struggled financially, and his father made the decision to emigrate to Australia. Reid arrived in Melbourne in May 1852, and his father subsequently led congregations in Essendon and North Melbourne. He moved the family to Sydney in 1858. Reid received his only formal schooling at the Melbourne Academy, now known as Scotch College. He received a classical education, and in later life recalled that he had "no appetite for that wide range of metaphysical propositions which juveniles were expected to comprehend"; he found Greek a "lazy horror". He left school aged about 13, when the family settled in Sydney, and began working as a junior clerk in a merchant's counting house. At the age of 15 he joined the debating society at the Sydney Mechanics' School of Arts, and according to his autobiography, "a more crude novice than he had never begun the practise of public speaking". In Sydney, Reid's father became a colleague of John Dunmore Lang at the Scots Church, and then from 1862 until his death in 1867 was the minister of the Mariners' Church on George Street. His mother, who died in 1885, was involved in the ragged schools movement. In later life, Reid praised his parents for his good upbringing.

Public service career
In 1864, Reid joined the New South Wales Civil Service as an assistant accountant in the Colonial Treasury, with an annual salary of £200. He was promoted to clerk of correspondence and contracts in 1868, and then chief clerk of correspondence in 1874 on a salary of £400. In 1876 he began to study law seriously, which would provide the independent income necessary to pursue a parliamentary career (given that parliamentary service was unpaid at the time). He became head of the Attorney-General's Department in 1878. In 1879, Reid qualified as a barrister. He made a name for himself by publishing pamphlets on topical issues. In 1875, he published his Five Essays on Free Trade, which brought him an honorary membership of the Cobden Club, and in 1878 the government published his New South Wales, the Mother Colony of the Australians, for distribution in Europe.

Political career
Reid's career was aided by his quick wit and entertaining oratory; he was described as being "perhaps the best platform speaker in the Empire", both amusing and informing his audiences "who flocked to his election meetings as to popular entertainment". In one particular incident his quick wit and affinity for humour were demonstrated when a heckler pointed to his ample paunch and exclaimed "What are you going to call it, George?" to which Reid replied: "If it's a boy, I'll call it after myself. If it's a girl I'll call it Victoria. But if, as I strongly suspect, it's nothing but piss and wind, I'll name it after you." His humour, however, was not universally appreciated. Alfred Deakin detested Reid, describing him as "inordinately vain and resolutely selfish" and their cold relationship would affect both their later careers.

Reid was elected top of the poll to the New South Wales Legislative Assembly as a member for the four-member electoral district of East Sydney in the 1880 New South Wales colonial election. He was not very active at first, as he was building up his legal practice, although he was concerned to reform the Robertson Land Acts, which had not prevented 96 land holders from controlling eight million acres (32,000 km2) between them.  Henry Parkes and John Robertson attempted to make minor amendments to the land acts but were defeated and at the subsequent election Parkes' party lost many seats.

The new premier, Alexander Stuart, offered Reid the position of Colonial Treasurer in January 1883, but he thought it wiser to accept the junior office of Minister of Public Instruction. He served 14 months in this office and succeeded in passing a much improved Education Act, which included the establishment of the first government high schools in the leading towns, technical schools (which became a model for the other colonies) and the provision of evening lectures at the university.

In February 1884, Reid lost his seat in parliament owing to a technicality; The Elections and Qualifications Committee held that the Governor had already issued five proclamations prior to the appointment of Francis Suttor to the office of Minister of Public Instruction thus both Suttor and his successor Reid were incapable of being validly appointed. At the resulting by-election Reid was defeated by a small majority as a result of the government's financial hardships due to the loss of revenue from the suspension of land sales. In 1885 he was re-elected in East Sydney and took a great part in the free trade or protection issue. He supported Sir Henry Parkes on the free trade side but, when Parkes came into power in 1887, declined a seat in his ministry. Parkes offered him a portfolio two years later and Reid again refused. He did not like Parkes personally and felt he would be unable to work with him. When payment of members of parliament was passed, Reid, who had always opposed it, paid the amount of his salary into the treasury. Reid had become one of Sydney's leading barristers by impressing juries by his cross-examinations and was made a Queen's Counsel in 1898.  In May 1891 four free traders, Reid, Jack Want, John Haynes and Jonathan Seaver, voted against the Fifth Parkes ministry in a motion of no confidence, which was only defeated by the casting vote of the Speaker of the New South Wales Legislative Assembly. Whilst the government survived the motion, parliament was dissolved on 6 June 1891.

Premier

In September 1891, the Parkes ministry was defeated, the Dibbs government succeeded it, and Parkes retired from the leadership of the Free Trade Party. Reid was elected leader of the opposition in his place.  In 1891, he married Florence (Flora) Ann Brumby, who was 23 years old to his 46. He managed to form his party into a coherent group although it "ran the whole gamut from conservative Sydney merchants through middle-class intellectuals to reformers who wished to replace indirect by direct taxation for social reasons."

At the 1894 election Reid made the establishment of a real free trade tariff with a system of direct taxation the main item of his policy, and had a great victory. Edmund Barton and other well-known protectionists lost their seats, Labor was reduced from 30 to 18, and Reid formed his first cabinet. One of his earliest measures was a new lands bill which provided for the division of pastoral leases into two-halves, one of which was to be open to the free selector, while the pastoral lessee got some security of tenure for the other half. Classification of crown lands according to their value was provided for, and the free selector, or his transferee, had to reside on the property.

At an early stage of the session, Parkes pressed the question of federation, and in response Reid invited the premiers of the other colonies to meet in conference on 29 January 1895. This resolved in favour of an elected Australasian Federal Convention, that would draw up a federal constitution, which would then to be subject of a referendum in each colony. Meanwhile, Reid had great trouble in passing his land and income tax bills. When he did get them through the Assembly the New South Wales Legislative Council threw them out.  Reid obtained a dissolution, was victorious at the polls, and heavily defeated Parkes for the new single-member electoral district of Sydney-King.  He eventually succeeded in passing his acts, which were moderate, but was strenuously opposed by the council, and it was only the fear that the chamber might be swamped with new appointments that eventually wore down the opposition. Reid was also successful in bringing in reforms in the keeping of public accounts and in the civil service generally. Other acts dealt with the control of inland waters, and much needed legislation relating to public health, factories, and mining, was also passed. In five years he achieved more than any of his predecessors.

On four occasions between December 1895 and May 1899 Reid was temporarily appointed to the vacant position of Solicitor General for New South Wales to allow him to deputise for the Attorney General of New South Wales, Jack Want, in his absence. Reid took on the position of Attorney-General in addition to being Premier in the last months of his government.

Federation

Reid supported the federation of the Australian colonies, but since the campaign was led by his Protectionist opponent Edmund Barton he did not take a leading role. He was dissatisfied by the draft constitution, especially the power of a Senate, elected on the basis of States rather than population, to reject money bills.

Following the Adelaide session in 1897 of the National Australasian Convention, Colonial Secretary Joseph Chamberlain sent the Colonial Office's extensive and sometimes critical comments on the current draft of the federal constitution to Reid (then in London for Queen Victoria's Diamond Jubilee), for his "private & independent" consideration.  At the Sydney and Melbourne sessions of the Convention in 1897 and 1898, Reid moved amendments based on those comments, covertly obtaining several concessions to British wishes.  He denied a suggestion that he had been "talking with ‘Joe’".  Reid did copy Chamberlain's comments to a select few other delegates, but they never revealed this.  They included Edmund Barton, chair of the Drafting Committee, which accommodated some of Chamberlain's more technical points.

In the aftermath of the Convention, Reid made his famous "Yes-No" speech at Sydney Town Hall, on 28 March 1898. He told his audience that he intended to deal with the bill "with the deliberate impartiality of a judge addressing a jury". After speaking for an hour and three-quarters the audience was still uncertain about his verdict. He concluded by declaring "my duty to Australia demands me to record my vote in favour of the bill". Barton congratulated him on stage, but later he and other Federationists were frustrated by Reid saying that, while he felt he could not desert the cause, he would not recommend any course to the electors: "Now, I say to you, having pointed out my mind, and having shown you the dark places as well as the light places of this constitution, I hope every man in this country, without coercion from me, without any interference from me, will judge for himself." He consistently kept this attitude until the poll was taken on 3 June 1898.  This earned him the nickname "Yes-No Reid". The referendum in New South Wales resulted in a small majority in favour, but the yes votes fell about 8000 short of the required 80,000. Subsequently, Reid was able to secure greater concessions for New South Wales.

At the general election held soon after, Barton challenged Reid in the premier's seat of Sydney-King. Although defeated him, but his party came back with a reduced majority. Reid fought for federation at the second referendum and it was carried in New South Wales, with 56.5 percent of valid votes cast for 'Yes'.  "A bizarre combination of the Labor Party, protectionists, Federation enthusiasts and die-hard anti-Federation free traders" censured Reid for paying the expenses of John Neild who had been commissioned to report on old-age pensions, prior to parliamentary approval. Governor Beauchamp refused Reid a dissolution of parliament, and Reid was defeated in a no confidence motion, 75 to 41, in September 1899. By this time Reid had grown extremely overweight and sported a walrus moustache and a monocle, but his buffoonish image concealed a shrewd political brain.

Federal politics

Leader of the Opposition (1901–1904)
Reid was elected to the first federal Parliament as the Member for the Division of East Sydney at the 1901 Australian federal election. The Free Trade Party won 28 out of 75 seats in the Australian House of Representatives, and 17 out of 36 seats in the Australian Senate. Labor no longer trusted Reid and gave their support to the Edmund Barton Protectionist Party government, so Reid became the first Leader of the Opposition, a position well-suited to his robust debating style and rollicking sense of humour. In the long tariff debate Reid was at a disadvantage as parliament was sitting in Melbourne and he could not entirely neglect his practice as a barrister in Sydney, as his parliamentary income was less than a tenth of his income from his legal practice. In their old stronghold of New South Wales free traders had won 12 seats, but Labor won six, and the old compact between Labor and Reid was a thing of the past.

On 18 August 1903, Reid resigned (the first member of the House of Representatives to do so) and challenged the government to oppose his re-election on the issue of its refusal to accept a system of equal electoral districts. On 4 September he successfully contested the 1903 East Sydney by-election against a Labor opponent. He was the only person in Australian federal parliamentary history to win back his seat at a by-election triggered by his own resignation, until John Alexander in 2017.

Alfred Deakin took over from Barton as Prime Minister and leader of the Protectionists. At the 1903 election, the Free Trade Party won 24 seats, with the Labor vote increasing mainly at the expense of the Protectionists.

Prime Minister (1904–1905)

In August 1904, when the Watson government resigned, Reid became Prime Minister. He was the first former state premier to become Prime Minister (the only other to date being Joseph Lyons). Reid did not have a majority in either House, and he knew it would be only a matter of time before the Protectionists patched up their differences with Labor, so he enjoyed himself in office while he could. In July 1905 the other two parties duly voted him out, and he left office with good grace.

Leader of the Opposition (1905–1908)
Reid adopted a strategy of trying to reorient the party system along Labor vs. non-Labor lines – prior to the 1906 election, he renamed his Free Trade Party to the Anti-Socialist Party. Reid envisaged a spectrum running from socialist to anti-socialist, with the Protectionist Party in the middle. This attempt struck a chord with politicians who were steeped in the Westminster tradition and regarded a two-party system as very much the norm. Zachary Gorman has argued that this attempt to impose clear 'lines of cleavage' in Federal politics was inspired by Reid's friend Joseph Carruthers who had achieved a political realignment in New South Wales that destroyed the Progressive middle party and created a Liberal-Labor divide. For Reid, anti-socialism was a natural product of his long-standing belief in Gladstonian liberalism.

Reid referred to Labor publicly using a damaging visual negative image of Labor as a hungry socialist tiger that would devour all. The anti-socialist campaign led to the Protectionist vote and seat count dropping significantly at the 1906 election, while both Reid's party and Labor won 26 seats each. The Deakin government continued with Labor support for the time being, despite only holding 16 seats after losing 10, although with another 5 independent Protectionists. Reid's anti-socialist campaign had nevertheless laid the groundwork for the desired realignment, and liberalism would come to sit on the centre-right of Australian politics.

In 1907–08, Reid strenuously resisted Deakin's commitment to increase tariff rates. When Deakin proposed the Commonwealth Liberal Party, a "Fusion" of the two non-Labor parties, Reid resigned as party leader on 16 November 1908. The following day, Joseph Cook was made leader until the parties merged.

On 24 December 1909 Reid resigned from Parliament (he was the first Member to have resigned twice), however his seat was left vacant until the 1910 election. His seat of East Sydney was won by Labor's John West, in an election which saw Labor win 42 of 75 seats, against the CLP on 31 seats. Labor also won a majority in the Senate.

Later life and legacy

In 1910, Reid was appointed as Australia's first High Commissioner in London.

Reid was extremely popular in Britain, and in 1916, when his term as High Commissioner ended, he was elected unopposed to the House of Commons of the United Kingdom for the seat of St George, Hanover Square as a Unionist candidate, where he acted as a spokesman for the self-governing Dominions in supporting the war effort. He died suddenly in London on 12 September 1918, aged 73, of cerebral thrombosis, survived by his wife and their two sons and daughter. His wife had become Dame Flora Reid GBE in 1917.  He is buried in Putney Vale Cemetery.

Reid's posthumous reputation suffered from the general acceptance of protectionist policies by other parties, as well as from his buffoonish public image. In 1989 W. G. McMinn published George Reid, a serious biography designed to rescue Reid from his reputation as a clownish reactionary and attempt to show his Free Trade policies as having been vindicated by history.

Honours

In 1897 Reid was made an Honorary Doctor of Civil Law (DCL) by Oxford University. Reid was also appointed a member of Her Majesty's Most Honourable Privy Council (1904), a Knight Grand Cross of the Order of St Michael and St George (1911) and a Knight Grand Cross of the Order of the Bath (1916).

In 1969 he was honoured on a postage stamp bearing his portrait issued by Australia Post.

Works
 The Australian Commonwealth and her relation to the British Empire  (address, 1912)

See also

Reid Ministry

Notes

References

Further reading

External links

 Archival records and sources held at the National Archives of Australia
 Audio lecture on the life of George Reid – National Museum of Australia
 Undated photo of George Reid and Mrs. Oliver T. Johnston from Library of Congress collection
 

|-

|-

|-

1845 births
1918 deaths
Prime Ministers of Australia
Premiers of New South Wales
Members of the Cabinet of Australia
Australian Leaders of the Opposition
Australian ministers for Foreign Affairs
Members of the Australian House of Representatives for East Sydney
Members of the Australian House of Representatives
Members of the New South Wales Legislative Assembly
Free Trade Party members of the Parliament of Australia
UK MPs 1910–1918
Members of the Parliament of the United Kingdom for English constituencies
Australian Knights Grand Cross of the Order of St Michael and St George
Australian Knights Grand Cross of the Order of the Bath
Australian politicians awarded knighthoods
Australian Presbyterians
Burials at Putney Vale Cemetery
People from Johnstone
People educated at Scotch College, Melbourne
Treasurers of New South Wales
High Commissioners of Australia to the United Kingdom
Attorneys General of the Colony of New South Wales
Solicitors General for New South Wales
Commonwealth Liberal Party members of the Parliament of Australia
Scottish emigrants to Australia
20th-century Australian politicians
Australian members of the Privy Council of the United Kingdom
Australian monarchists
Australian King's Counsel